This partial list of non-marine molluscs of El Hatillo Municipality, Miranda, Venezuela shows that El Hatillo Municipality has a rich mollusc fauna. The municipality is land-locked, therefore there are no saltwater molluscs.

This list currently (2011) includes only terrestrial gastropods, in other words land slugs and land snails; whether there are any freshwater species of snails and clams is not yet recorded. The terrestrial mollusc fauna contains 38 species that have been reported in the specialized literature and by observation in the territories of the municipality.

El Hatillo Municipality consists of urban and rural areas:
The urban areas are: El Hatillo town, El Calvario, La Lagunita, Alto Hatillo La Boyera, Las Marías, Oripoto, Los Pomelos, Los Naranjos, Los Geranios, La Cabaña,  Cerro Verde, Llano Verde, Colinas, Vista El Valle, and Los Olivos y El Cigarral.
The rural areas are: La Unión, Corralito, Turgua, La Hoyadita, Sabaneta, La Mata, Caicaguana, and Los Naranjos y Altos de Halcón.

Gastropods 
Family Helicinidae
 genus Helicina
 Helicina spp.

Family Ampullariidae
 genus Marisa
 Marisa cornuarietis Linnaeus, 1858
 genus  Pomacea 
 Pomacea glauca Linnaeus, 1856
 Pomacea bridgesii (Reeve, 1856) - introduced
 Pomacea canaliculata (Lamarck, 1819) - introduced
 Pomacea haustrum (Revee, 1856) - introduced

Family Neocyclotidae
 genus Poteria
 Poteria fasciatum (Kobelt & Schwanheim, 1912)
 Poteria translucida (Sowerby 1843)

Family Pachychilidae
 genus Pachychilus
 Pachychilus laevisimus (Sowerby, 1824)

Family Thiaridae
 genus Tarebia
 Tarebia granifera (Lamarck, 1822) - introduced
 genus Melanoides
 Melanoides tuberculata (Müller, 1774) - introduced
 Melanoides sp. - introduced

Family Lymnaeidae
 genus Lymnaea
 Lymnaea columellaris Say, 1817
 Lymnaea cubensis Pfeifer, 1839

Family Planorbidae
 genus Helisoma
 Helisoma duryi  (Wetherby, 1989) - introduced
 genus Taphius
 Taphius glabratus (Say, 1818)

Family Physidae
 genus Aplexa
 Aplexa rivalis (Maton & Rackett, 1807)

Family Achatinidae
 genus Achatina
 Achatina fulica (Bowdick, 1822) - introduced

Family Arionidae
 genus Arion
 Arion subfuscus (Draparnaud)

Family Amphibulimidae
 genus Dryptus
 Dryptus marmoratus (Dunker, 1844)
 genus Plekocheilus
 Plekocheilus distortus (Bruguiére, 1789)
 Plekocheilus euryomphala (Jonas, 1844)

Family Orthalicidae
 genus Orthalicus
 Orthalicus maracaibensis (Pfeiffer, 1856)
Family Camaenidae
 genus Labyrinthus
  Labyrinthus plicatus (Born, 1780)
  Labyrinthus umbrus Thompson, 1957

Family Helicidae
 genus Helix
Cepaea hortensis (Müller, 1774) - introduced
  Cepaea nemoralis (Linnaeus, 1758) - introduced
Cornu aspersum = Helix aspersa Müller, 1799 - introduced
  Helix pomatia  Linnaeus, 1758 - introduced

Family Agriolimacidae
 genus Deroceras
 Deroceras laeve (Müller, 1774)

Family Strophocheilidae
 genus Megalobulimus
 Megalobulimus oblongus (Müller, 1774)

Family Subulinidae
 genus Lamellaxis
 Lamellaxis micra (D'Orbigny, 1842)
 genus Leptinaria
 Leptinaria lamellata (Potiez & Michaud, 1838)
 Leptinaria unilamellata (D'Orbigny, 1842)
 genus Subulina
 Subulina octona (Bruguiére, 1792)

Family Succineidae
 genus Omalonyx
 Omalonyx pattersonae Tillier, 1981
 genus Succinea
 Succinea sp.

Family Veronicellidae
 genus Diplosolenodes
 Diplosolenodes occidentalis (Guilding, 1825)

Gallery: mollusk species that occur in El Hatillo Municipality

Bivalves
There are an unknown number of freshwater bivalves in the area.

See also
 List of echinoderms of Venezuela
 List of Poriferans of Venezuela
 List of introduced molluscs of Venezuela
 List of marine molluscs of Venezuela
 List of molluscs of Falcón state, Venezuela
 List of non-marine molluscs of Venezuela
 List of birds of Venezuela
 List of mammals of Venezuela

References

Bibliography
 Baker, H. B. 1924: “Land and freshwater mollusk of the dutch leeward islands.” Occasional Papers of the Museum of Zoology University of Michigan. Nº 152.
 Baker, H. B. 1925: “The mollusca collected by the University of Michigan-Willianson Expedition in Venezuela”. Occasional Papers of the Museum of Zoology University of Michigan. Nº 156.
 Ernst, A. 1976: “Enumeración sistemática d las especies de moluscos terrestres y de agua dulce halladas hasta ahora en los alrededores de Caracas  y demás partes de la República”. Apuntes estadísticos del Distrito Federal. p:77-85.
 Lutz, A. 1928: “Moluscos de agua dulce recogidos y observados en Venezuela”. En: Estudios de zoología y parasitología venezolana. Río de Janeiro-Brasil.
 Martens, E. V. 1873. “Die Binnenmollusken Venezuela's”. In: Festschrift zur Feier des hundertjähringen Bestehens der Gesellschaft naturforschender Freunde zu Berlin, vol. Reichert, K. B. ed.,157-225.
 Tello, J. 1968: “Historia Natural de Caracas”. Ediciones del Consejo Municipal del Distrito Federal. Caracas – Venezuela.
 Wens, W. 1959: “Gastropoda”. Gebrüder Borntrager.  Berlin – Germany. 3 Volúmenes.

Cartographies references
 Blanco D, A. y Fuentes, R. S/F. “El Hatillo destino ecoturístico para observadores de aves”. IATURH. Caracas - Venezuela
 República de Venezuela. 1964: “Caracas”. Dirección de Cartografía Nacional. Hoja 6847. Escala 1: 100000.

External links
 —Venciclopedia.com: Moluscos del Municipio El Hatillo (Molluscs of El Hatillo Municipality)
 Applesnail.net: Apple snail website

.El Hatillo
Lists of biota of Venezuela
Miranda (state)
Venezuelas, El Hatillo Municipality
Venezuelas, El Hatillo Municipality